The Herscovici classification is a system of categorizing medial malleolus fractures of the distal tibia based on level.


Classification

See also 
 Ankle fracture
 Pilon fracture
 Danis–Weber classification
 Lauge-Hansen classification

References
 

Bone fractures
Ankle fracture classifications
Injuries of ankle and foot